Thomas Jerome Schaefer is an American mathematician.

He obtained his Ph.D. in December 1978 from the University of California, Berkeley, where he worked in the Department of Mathematics. His Ph.D. advisor was Richard M. Karp. 

He is well-known for his dichotomy theorem, stating that any problem generalizing Boolean satisfiability in a certain way is either in the complexity class P or is NP-complete.

References

Year of birth missing (living people)
Living people
20th-century American mathematicians
American computer scientists
University of California, Berkeley alumni
21st-century American mathematicians